Nivdung is an Indian Marathi language film directed by Munawar Shameem. The film stars Bhushan Pradhan and Sanskruti Balgude. Music by Rafique Shaikh. The film was released on 21 October 2016.

Synopsis 
Having tried his luck in the big city, a struggling young actor returns to his village. Along with him, comes an established theatre actress who falls in love with the place.

Cast 
 Bhushan Pradhan
 Sanskruti Balgude
 Sara Shrawan
 Astad Kale
 Prajakta Dighe
 Shekhar Phadke

Soundtrack

Critical response 
Nivdung film received negative reviews from critics. Mihir Bhanage of The Times of India gave the film 2 stars out of 5 and wrote "Bhushan seriously needs to choose better movies. It would be a shame if his potential goes waste due to bad choices. Sanskruti does the standard village bimbette stuff although her role has scope for other things". Ganesh Matkari of Pune Mirror wrote "Nivdung is a simplistic, shallow melodrama, which is considerably inferior to the idea it springs from. Luckily, for the film, it’s not releasing against a major player in the field". Soumitra Pote of Maharashtra Times gave the film 2 stars out of 5 and wrote "When we say the name of this movie, we remember the old Nivdung. 'Ti geli tevha... Hridaynath Mangeshkar's music and grace's poetry".

References

External links
 

2016 films
2010s Marathi-language films
Indian drama films